Farmers' Bank is the first bank museum of its kind found in Virginia.  Farmers' Bank was incorporated in 1812 and the Petersburg, Virginia branch opened in 1817.

History
The three-story building, built in the Federal style, was a frequent meeting place for the community.  The first floor held the banking area, including the vault, while the third floor was home to the bank manager and his family.  The bank maintained operations through the American Civil War and closed by order of the Virginia General Assembly in 1866.

It was listed on the National Register of Historic Places in 1972. It is located in the Petersburg Old Town Historic District.

Preservation
The property served various functions throughout the next hundred years, until it was acquired by Preservation Virginia in the 1960s.  Preservation Virginia undertook restoration of the building, and reopened it as a museum and visitors center.

The building now houses the Petersburg Visitors Center.  Visitors can see a printing press and scales for weighing gold.  The living quarters on the third floor has also been restored.

References

External links

 Preservation Petersburg: Farmers Bank
 Petersburg Visitors Center website

History museums in Virginia
Bank buildings on the National Register of Historic Places in Virginia
Buildings and structures in Petersburg, Virginia
Museums in Petersburg, Virginia
National Register of Historic Places in Petersburg, Virginia
Federal architecture in Virginia
Commercial buildings completed in 1817
Individually listed contributing properties to historic districts on the National Register in Virginia
Bank museums